Field hockey at the 1987 Pan American Games in Indianapolis, United States took place from 8 to 19 August 1987.

Medal summary

Medal table

Men's tournament

Group stage

Group A

Group B

Ninth to tenth place classification

Fifth to eighth place classification

Cross-overs

Seventh and eighth place

Fifth and sixth place

Medal round

Semi-finals

Bronze medal match

Gold medal match

Final standings

Women's tournament

Group stage

Group A

Group B

Fifth to seventh place classification

Cross-over

Fifth and sixth place

Medal round

Semi-finals

Bronze medal match

Gold medal match

Final standings

References
 Pan American Games field hockey medalists on HickokSports

Pan American Games
1987
Events at the 1987 Pan American Games
1987 Pan American Games